Saul Novack (1918 in Manhattan – March 4, 1998) was the dean of arts and humanities at Queens College, City University of New York,  from 1978 to 1982 and a professor emeritus at the college's Aaron Copland School of Music.,
 
Novack graduated from City College in 1939 and Columbia University in 1941.

His daughter Carol Novack is a poet and co-founder of the MadHat Press.

References

External links
Saul Novack Electronic Archive

1918 births
1998 deaths
Queens College, City University of New York faculty
City College of New York alumni
Columbia University alumni